Havis Amanda is a fountain and a statue in Helsinki, Finland by the sculptor Ville Vallgren (1855–1940). The work was modelled in 1906 in Paris, and erected at its present location at the Market Square in Kaartinkaupunki in 1908. Today it is recognized as one of the most important and beloved pieces of art in Helsinki.

Sculpture
The Havis Amanda is one of Vallgren's Parisian Art Nouveau works. Cast in bronze, it rests on a fountain made of granite. The sculpture is of a mermaid standing on seaweed as she rises from the water, with four fish spouting water at her feet, surrounded by four sea lions. Vallgren's intention was to symbolize the rebirth of Helsinki. According to Vallgren's letters the model for the statue was a then 19-year-old Parisian woman, Marcelle Delquini.

Vallgren himself simply called the work Merenneito, but it quickly started to get additional nicknames. The Finland-Swedish newspapers dubbed it Havis Amanda and the Finnish Haaviston Manta or simply Manta. Havis Amanda is the common name used in brochures and travel guides.

History

Havin Amanda was unveiled on September 20, 1908. The work drew strong criticism at first, especially from women. Its nakedness and seductiveness were considered inappropriate. Not all groups objected to the nudity per se, but putting it on a pedestal was thought to subjugate women by sexually objectifying them and making them appear weak. Some women's rights groups criticised the look of the figure as plain or "a common French whore", lacking innocence. The sea lions, with their human tongues hanging out, were said to represent men lusting after the mademoiselle. Vallgren considered himself a worshipper of women. Many in the cultural elite of Finland considered Vallgren an outsider and had judged his work even before it was finished. A good friend of his, Albert Edelfelt, was instrumental through his influence in getting the work ordered.

Every year on Vappu, Manta serves as a centrepiece for the celebrations. Students of the local universities place a student cap on the head of the statue in an elaborate ceremony called "Mantan lakitus" ("The capping of Manta").

In 2002 Spencer Tunick organized a photoshoot of voluntary nude Finns, of whom almost 2000 showed up, posing around the statue as part of his Nude Adrift, Finland 3 project. In 2014 artist Tatzu Nishi constructed a temporary hotel setting around the statue called Hotel Manta where visitors could see the statue in a new, unusual setting.

There are fears of the old and hollow statue possibly breaking from people climbing on it. In 2019 there were calls from officials to limit celebrations and climbing on the statue. During 2020's Vappu, out of concern for the COVID-19 pandemic, the city and the police decided to fence off the statue for the time being and directed the public towards a digital version of capping the statue.

Gallery

See also

Art in Finland

References 

Statues and sculptures in Helsinki
Kaartinkaupunki
1906 sculptures
Outdoor sculptures in Finland
Art Nouveau sculptures and memorials
Bronze sculptures in Finland
Nude sculptures
Sculptures of women
Fountains in Finland
Art Nouveau architecture in Helsinki
1908 establishments in Finland
Walpurgis Night traditions